Yongda is the romanization of Chinese word 永大 and 永达 (Pinyin: Yǒng dà and Yǒng dá respectively), may refer to:
 China Yongda Automobiles Services Holdings Limited, a Chinese listed company based in Shanghai (listed on the Hong Kong Stock Exchange)
 Yongda Cup, a Go competition
 Jilin Yongda Group, a Chinese listed company based in Jilin City, Jilin Province (listed on the Shenzhen Stock Exchange)
 Fujian Yongda Group, a Chinese steel maker based in Zhangzhou, Fujian Province

See also
 Yungtay, the Taiwanese romanization of the Chinese word 永大
 Yungtay Engineering Co., Ltd.
 Shanghai Yungtay, a subsidiary of Yungtay Engineering
 Yungtay Cup, a Go competition